The House of Baghoch commonly known as Baghochia was the ruling dynasty of Hathwa Raj and Bansgaon Estate (Dileepnagar Nagar Estate) until 1947 when the state was abolished and merged into the newly formed Union of India. The House takes its name from Baghoch and Bharhichowra, the ancient seats of the rulers of  Hathwa Raj. The name Baghauch also may have been associated with the clan from totemistic stage as the name makes reference to Bagh (Tiger) as the clans totem. Based on the totem the name of the first capital was Baghauch. They are a sub-group of the Vats gotra Bhumihar Brahmin The founder of the dynasty was Raja Bir Sen who played an instrumental role in the invasion of the Sakyas by the Kosla Maharaj Virudhaka in 6th century BCE, and it is in the aftermath that Raja Bir Sen got part of the newly invaded country as his Raj. This makes the Baghochia dynasty one of the oldest and the longest ruling dynasty in the world and also a clan with one of the deepest genealogy. 

The cadet branches also held numerous Zamindaris, Ghatwali and Mulraiyatis in Bihar, Jharkhand and Eastern Uttar Pradesh. Some of the notable Zamindari estates held by cadet branch of Baghochia House includes Bansgawa Estate(DilipNagar Estate), Tamkuhi Raj, Salemgarh estate, Kiajori(Chakai) estate and Ledo Gadi. Kharna estate was another notable Ghatwali estate acquired by Babu Ananda Rai.

References

Indian feudalism
Titles in India
Titles of national or ethnic leadership
Royal titles
Dynasties of India
Bhumihar clans
History of Bihar
History of Jharkhand
Hindu dynasties
Kingdoms of Bihar